Israel is set to participate in the Eurovision Song Contest 2023 in Liverpool, United Kingdom, having internally selected Noa Kirel to represent the country with the song "Unicorn".

Background 

In , Michael Ben David with the song "I.M" failed to qualify for the final.

The Israeli national broadcaster, Israeli Public Broadcasting Corporation (IPBC/Kan), has been in charge of the nation's participation in the contest since . Kan confirmed Israel's participation in the contest on 21 February 2021. Between 2015 and 2020, the Israeli entry was selected through the reality singing competition  ("The Next Star for Eurovision") in collaboration with Keshet and Tedy Productions, while in 2022, Kan cooperated with Reshet to select the Israeli entry through the reality singing competition The X Factor Israel. On 13 June 2022, Kan announced that they would not continue their cooperation with Reshet and would independently conduct an internal selection to select the artist that would represent Israel instead. This marked the first time since  that Israel had used an internal selection, and the first time that Kan selected the Israeli entry without collaborating with other broadcasters.

Before Eurovision

Internal selection 

The Israeli representative for the Eurovision Song Contest 2023 was internally selected by Kan. A special committee consisting of members from Kan, music editors and external representatives each suggested two artists from 78 initially considered based on airplay on Gimel and Galgalatz, and nominees for Singer of the Year and Group of the Year awards in 2019, 2020 and 2021. Among artists that were considered included Mergui, Ella-Lee Lahav, Noa Kirel, Static & Ben-El Tavori and Ran Danker. The members of the committee were Ofri Gopher (Director of Kan Music Stations), Yuval Cohen (Creative Director and Deputy Executive Producer of the ), Kobi Nussbaum (Head of Production at Kan), Sharon Drix (culture and entertainment director of Kan), Tali Katz (Head of Delegation for Israel at the Eurovision Song Contest), Tal Argaman (DJ and music editor at Kan 88), Yossi Gispan (lyricist), Eden Darso (singer-songwriter), Avia Farchi (MTV Israel presenter) and Leon Feldman (music editor and presenter). On 11 July 2022, Kan announced that Noa Kirel had topped the list with Mergui placing second. Despite Kirel stating the following day that she and her team had yet to make a decision, Israeli television channel HaHadashot 12 reported in early August 2022 that the invitation had been accepted by the singer, which was later confirmed during a press conference held at the Hotel Carlton in Tel Aviv on 10 August 2022.

Kirel was given artistic freedom from the Israeli broadcaster. The singer was offered songwriters from other countries, but decided to stick with a local Israeli team for Eurovision, adding that her song will contain "all kinds of ethnic, Mediterranean and even Israeli directions". In early September 2022, it was reported that the Israeli song will be created in a songwriting camp that will allow songwriters to work with each other to create their entry, with composers such as Doron Medalie, Ron Beaton, Jordi, Nitzan Kaykov, Itay Shimoni, and Eitan Peled all being rumoured to take part. In late September 2022, the Israeli budget for the Eurovision Song Contest 2023 was revealed to be around US$900 thousand, with a majority being covered by Kirel's team, the rest by the broadcaster Kan. 

From an initial pool of three songs, the chosen song was revealed to be titled "Unicorn" on 17 January 2023, written by Medalie, May Sfadia, Yinon Yahel and Kirel herself. The song was revealed on 8 March during a special televised broadcast titled  ("Our Song for Eurovision") on Kan 11, as well as online via kan.org.il.

At Eurovision 
According to Eurovision rules, all nations with the exceptions of the host country and the "Big Five" (France, Germany, Italy, Spain and the United Kingdom) are required to qualify from one of two semi-finals in order to compete for the final; the top ten countries from each semi-final progress to the final. The European Broadcasting Union (EBU) split up the competing countries into six different pots based on voting patterns from previous contests, with countries with favourable voting histories put into the same pot. On 31 January 2023, an allocation draw was held, which placed each country into one of the two semi-finals, and determined which half of the show they would perform in. Israel has been placed into the first semi-final, to be held on 9 May 2023, and has been scheduled to perform in the second half of the show.

References 

2023
Countries in the Eurovision Song Contest 2023
Eurovision